

Belgium
 Belgian Congo – Léon Pétillon, Governor-General of Belgian Congo (1952–1958)

France
 French Somaliland – 
 Numa François Henri Sadoul, Governor of French Somaliland (1950–1954)
 Roland Joanes Louis Pré, Governor of French Somaliland (1954)
 René Petitbon, Governor of French Somaliland (1954–1957)
 Guinea – Jean Paul Parisot, Governor of Guinea (1953–1955)

Portugal
 Angola – José Agapito de Silva Carvalho, High Commissioner of Angola (1948–1955)

United Kingdom
 Aden – Sir Tom Hickinbotham, Governor of Aden (1951–1956)
 Malta Colony – 
Sir Gerald Creasy, Governor of Malta (1949–1954)
Sir Robert Laycock, Governor of Malta (1954–1959)
 Northern Rhodesia – 
 Sir Gilbert McCall Rennie, Governor of Northern Rhodesia (1948–1954)
 Alexander Thomas Williams, acting Governor of Northern Rhodesia (1954)
 Sir Arthur Benson, Governor of Northern Rhodesia (1954–1959)

Colonial governors
Colonial governors
1954